The Hillview Reservoir is a  storage reservoir in southeastern Yonkers, New York. It was built within a six-year period from 1909–1915 by the New York City Board of Water Supply to receive water from the newly constructed Catskill Aqueduct, which drained water from the Ashokan Reservoir and sent it down into the Kensico Reservoir, where it would, in turn, be drained back into  a continuation of the Catskill Aqueduct, and sent into the Hillview Reservoir.

The reservoir itself has a maximum capacity of 900 million US gallons (3,400,000 m³), and water from the reservoir is sent through New York City Water Tunnels No. 1 and No. 2. New York City Water Tunnel No. 3, which is still under construction, is planned to take water from the Kensico Reservoir, and immediately send it into the Hillview Reservoir, and then into the rest of New York City. The reservoir itself does not impound a river, and is held up by walls on all sides.

In 1993, city officials considered building a concrete cover over the reservoir to prevent excrement from seagulls contaminating the water with bacteria and viruses.

In March 2019, the New York City Department of Environmental Protection (DEP) made an agreement with the United States Environmental Protection Agency (EPA) to cover the reservoir by 2049 to comply with the Safe Drinking Water Act.  They also agreed to enhance efforts to manage wildlife at the reservoir in the meantime, eliminating cliff swallow nests and capturing or killing waterfowl.

See also
List of reservoirs and dams in New York
New York City water supply system

References 

Sometime around1956, a seaplane attempted to land in the reservoir and either needed more runway length or didn't make the water and crashed on the Kimball ave slope 

Water infrastructure of New York City
Geography of Yonkers, New York
Reservoirs in Westchester County, New York
Protected areas of Westchester County, New York
Reservoirs in New York (state)
1915 establishments in New York (state)